KGRD is a Christian radio station licensed to Orchard, Nebraska, broadcasting on 105.3 MHz FM. It is owned by The Praise Network, Inc.

KGRD airs Christian Contemporary Music, as well as a variety of Christian Talk and Teaching programs including; Insight for Living with Chuck Swindoll, Turning Point with David Jeremiah, Focus on the Family, Break Point with Chuck Colson, and Unshackled!.

Translators
KGRD is also heard on four full powered stations, KPNO 90.9 in Norfolk, Nebraska, KGKD 90.5 in Columbus, Nebraska, KGRJ 89.9 in Chamberlain, South Dakota, and KGRH 88.1 in the Mitchell, South Dakota area, as well as on four translators in Northern Nebraska and Southern South Dakota.

References

External links
KGRD's official website

GRD
Orchard, Nebraska
Mass media in the Mitchell, South Dakota micropolitan area
Radio stations established in 1987
1987 establishments in Nebraska